Josefino Cenizal (14 September 1916 – 27 March 2015) was a Filipino  actor, director, and composer from Tanza, Cavite. In 1937, he began to direct music films at Parlatone-Hispano Films, which is where his musical career began. In 2010, he received the Dangal ng Filscap Award.  His career spanned from the late 1930s to the 1970s. He is famous for adapting "Ang Pasko Ay Sumapit" in 1938 with lyrics provided by Levi Celerio from the original Cebuano Christmas carol entitled "Kasadya Ning Taknaa" composed by Vicente D. Rubi and Mariano Vestil.

Personal life 
Josefino Cenizal was born to Rosario(Ymzon) Cenizal and Julio Cenizal on September 14, 1916 in Tanza, Cavite.  He is also the only son of four children. His mother was influential to his musical roots, enrolling him at a music school at the age of 8. She also taught him a few instruments including the violin. Cenizal was married to fellow actor, Olivia Cenizal until her death in 2008. They had one child named Moppet.

Education 
He studied at Manila Law College in 1948 and at the Lyceum of the Philippines in 1954. He stopped studying law to pursue his musical career.

Career 
His mother taught him violin and a method called solfeggio. Cenizal also taught himself to play the banjo. While studying at U.P. Conservatory of Music, he also played piano at late night radio stations when he was young. This paved the way for his career overseas. Cenizal honed his craft further by playing music in cruises during the summer At 17, he got his first job—conducting the US Army and Navy Club. He continued pursuing music while studying before he quit to pursue his passion. He was also a musical director/composer in several films in the late 1940s such as "Fort Santiago," "Kamagong:Bayani ng Mahirap"(Mahogany:The Poor's Hero) and "Siete Dolores"(Seven Dolores). From the late 1940s until his death, Cenizal composed over 30 songs.

Acting 
He also starred in some films including Rosa Birhen(1940) “Rose Virgin” and Bicol Express(1957), and Milagrosang Kamay "Miraculous Hand" (1961).

Directing 
Cenizal also tried his hand at directing. He was able to direct one of his own films, “Rosa Birhen” while acting. It was also during this time that he composed one of his famous songs called "Hindi Kita Malimot", which was used in the said film.

Works

References

External links
 

1910s births
2015 deaths
People from Tanza, Cavite
Male actors from Cavite
Place of death missing
Filipino folk composers
Filipino film score composers